Milton Earle Beebe (November 27, 1840 – February 3, 1923) was an American architect who designed numerous buildings in Buffalo, New York, in Fargo, North Dakota, and elsewhere. He designed courthouses "at Warren, Smethport, Cambria, and Huntingdon in Pennsylvania, costing $100,000 each." Several are listed on the National Register of Historic Places. He also designed Early Commercial architecture buildings, residences, churches and public buildings.

Biography
Beebe was born November 27, 1840, in Cassadaga, Chautauqua County, New York. Beebe was the third son of Justus Beebe (1811 - 1886) and Harriet (Quigley) Beebe (1819 - 1896). He was a Private in the Union Army on September 11, 1861, in Stockton, New York, and was assigned to Company K, 9th New York Cavalry on October 2, 1861. He was promoted to Bugler on October 24, 1861, and received a Disability Discharge on June 20, 1862. After the war he took up the study of architecture and worked for Wilcox and Porter (especially under C.K. Porter) did carpentry work, and went to Chicago where he studied under Gurdon P. Randall for two years. He established his own practice in Buffalo in 1873. Beebe designed several courthouses. He was "zealous" Republican and was elected Alderman in the Second Ward. He ran for mayor in 1881 but lost to Grover Cleveland.

Beebe married Rosina Ida Phillips on November 5, 1862, in Cassadaga, New York. He was later remarried to Rose Josephine (Curran) Beebe (1869–1943).  He died February 3, 1923, in San Diego and is buried at Greenwood Memorial Park (San Diego). Beebe was an active member of the Masonic fraternity and a leader of the A.O.U.W. including as Grand Master Workman for the state of New York in 1880.

Beebe's residence was at 4481 Porter Avenue.

Beebe lived in Fargo, North Dakota, from about 1900 to 1911.  The M.E. Beebe Historic District, which includes his workshop, was listed on the National Register of Historic Places in 2015.

Works

Cambria County Courthouse, built 1880 with Second Empire architecture, Center St. Ebensburg, PA (Beebe,M.E. and Shank,Henry), NRHP-listed
Eddy County Courthouse, 524 Central Ave. New Rockford, ND (Beebe,M.E.), NRHP-listed
Hubbard County Courthouse, 3rd and Court Sts. Park Rapids, MN (Beebe,M.E.), NRHP-listed
Main Building, Concordia College, S. 8th St. Moorhead, MN (Beebe,Milton M.), NRHP-listed
E. G. Patterson Building, 412-414 Main St. Bismarck, ND (Beebe, Milton Earl), NRHP-listed*Soo Hotel, 112-114 5th St., N. Bismarck, ND (Beebe,Milton Earl), NRHP-listed
Warren County Courthouse, Market St. and 4th Ave. Warren, PA (Beebe,M.E.), NRHP-listed
McKean County Courthouse (1880), Smethport, the third county courthouse built. After a fire in 1940, appears to have been replaced with a neoclassical building.
Pottsville Courthouse (1892) 
Greene block, corner Washington and North Division Streets 
Nellany block, corner of Main and Mohawk Streets
Post Office block on Seneca Street opposite the Custom House 
Austin Exchange building on Main Street below Seneca Street
Police Stations 3 and 7 
Fire Department Headquarters 
Mrs. M.A. Ransom residence
Mrs. E. Swope residence on Main Street
Henry Erb residence on Main Street
Geo. H. Van Vleck residence on Delaware Avenue
James H. Lee residence on Delaware Avenue
Nelson Holland residence on Delaware Avenue
C.S. Clarke residence on North Street 
George Goetz residence on Niagara street 
Knapp residence on Franklin Street
George W. Tew residence in Jamestown 
N. Babcock residence in Silver Creek
 S. Howes residence in Silver Creek 
Presbyterian church in Jamestown
Episcopal church in St. Catharines, Ontario 
Methodist Episcopal church in Tonawanda 
Episcopal church in Lancaster 
Methodist Episcopal church in Aurora
Congregational church in Arcade
 German Evangelical church in Buffalo
German Methodist Episcopal church in Buffalo
Mooney & Brisbane Building (1895)
Seymour H. Knox house at 414 Porter Avenue in Buffalo
Masten Park High School (1897), built with Italian ceramic terra cotta block, poured concrete roof, decorated with red Spanish tile on the outside and slate shingles on the backside. Destroyed by a 1912 fire. Sprinklers were in the basement where the dynamo was located.
Moorhead, Minnesota, public library (1906) was funded by Andrew Carnegie. It was demolished in 1963.
J. F. Haven Iron Building on Main Street and Seneca Street.
Lewis J. Bennett house in Central Park, Buffalo built for Lewis J. Bennett (1833 - 1925) owner of Buffalo Cement Company and developer of the Central Park area of Buffalo.
Tucker Building
Zink & Hatch Building at Niagara Street and Eagle Street
J. C.  Jewett Building at 327 Washington Street

Gallery

References

Further reading

Architectural Portfolio of Some of the Buildings Erected by M. E. Beebe & Son, Architects, Buffalo, N.Y. images of some of his work from an Unknown Binding – January 1, 1895.Architectural Portfolio of Some of the Buildings Erected by M. E. Beebe & Son, Architects, Buffalo, N.Y. Actual book link here published by Wenborne-Sumner Company, 1895 and its Index of buildings here

19th-century American architects
Architects from Buffalo, New York
People from Chautauqua County, New York
1840 births
1923 deaths
Architects from North Dakota
20th-century American architects